Pordenone railway station serves the city and comune of Pordenone, in the autonomous region of Friuli-Venezia Giulia, northeastern Italy.  Opened in 1855, the station is located on the Venice–Udine railway.  Although it is not a junction or terminal station, it is used by a great many passengers.

The station is currently managed by Rete Ferroviaria Italiana (RFI).  However, the commercial area of the passenger building is managed by Centostazioni.  Train services to and from the station are operated by Trenitalia.  Each of these companies is a subsidiary of Ferrovie dello Stato (FS), Italy's state-owned rail company.

Location
Pordenone railway station is situated in Via Pola, at the western edge of the city centre.

History
In the same year, the next portion of line, to Casarsa, was completed. Only in 1860 did the line reach its final destination, Udine.

Features
The station is equipped with a large passenger building that houses many services, including ticketing, a kiosk, a bar, a bank, and a Club Eurostar.

Train services
The station is served by the following service(s):

High speed services (Frecciarossa) Udine - Treviso - Venice - Padua - Bologna - Florence - Rome
High speed services (Frecciarossa) Udine - Treviso - Venice - Padua - Verona - Milan
High speed services (Railjet) Vienna - Klagenfurt - Villach - Udine - Treviso - Venice
Night train (Nighjet) Munich - Tarvisio - Udine - Treviso - Venice
Night train (EuroNight) Vienna - Linz - Salzburg - Villach - Udine - Treviso - Venice
Night train (Intercity Notte) Trieste - Udine - Venice - Padua - Bologna - Rome
Express services (Regionale Veloce) Trieste - Gorizia - Udine - Treviso - Venice
Regional services (Treno regionale) Trieste - Gorizia - Udine - Treviso - Venice

Passenger and train movements
The movement of passengers at the station is about 3,000,000 people per year, which means that Pordenone is the third busiest station in Friuli-Venezia Giulia in terms of numbers of passengers, after Udine and Trieste Centrale. Passenger traffic is heavy at all hours of the day.

The station is a transit stop for all types of trains. The destinations of the regional trains are: Udine, Venezia Santa Lucia, Sacile, Trieste Centrale and Casarsa. The station is also served by Frecciargento and night trains to Rome and Frecciabianca trains to Milan. International trains operate to Vienna and Munich.

Interchange with the bus is excellent: in the square outside the station are stops for urban and suburban buses. In front of the station there is a taxi stand.

See also

History of rail transport in Italy
List of railway stations in Friuli-Venezia Giulia
Rail transport in Italy
Railway stations in Italy

References

External links

This article is based upon a translation of the Italian language version as at December 2010.

Railway stations in Friuli-Venezia Giulia
Railway stations opened in 1855
Pordenone
1855 establishments in the Austrian Empire